The County Borough of Barnsley, and its predecessor, the Municipal Borough of Barnsley, was a local government district in the West Riding of Yorkshire, England, from 1869 to 1974.

Barnsley became a municipal borough in 1869, and a county borough in 1913, making it administratively independent of the West Riding County Council. The borough's boundaries were extended to absorb Ardsley and Monk Bretton in 1921 and Carlton in 1938.

Barnsley Town Hall was opened on 14 December 1933 as the seat of local government. The Classical Portland stone building was designed by Sir Arnold Thornely and is Grade II listed.

The borough was abolished under the Local Government Act 1972, and created the centre of the new Metropolitan Borough of Barnsley by a merger with Cudworth, Darfield, Darton, Dearne, Dodworth, Hoyland Nether, Penistone, Royston, Wombwell and Worsborough urban districts, along with Penistone Rural District, part of Hemsworth Rural District and part of Wortley Rural District, all in the West Riding of Yorkshire.

References

County boroughs of England
County Borough of
Districts of England abolished by the Local Government Act 1972